Paul Richard Green (born July 9, 1972) is an American record producer, film producer, director, screenwriter, singer-songwriter, music teacher, entrepreneur, and philanthropist who founded School of Rock (formerly known as The Paul Green School of Rock Music), a performance-based music program for kids. This for-profit educational company operates and sponsors franchises for after-school music instructional programs in the United States.

First established in Philadelphia in 1998 by Paul Green, schools have opened in states including New York, Utah, California, Illinois, Massachusetts, Minnesota, Maryland, Oregon, Washington, D.C., Virginia, Florida, Georgia, Texas, Colorado, Delaware, Washington, New Jersey, and North Carolina and internationally in Mexico. In 2005, the company was the subject of a documentary film titled Rock School. Paul Green left The School of Rock in early 2010.

On August 9, 2011, the Woodstock Film Festival announced that Green has moved to the Woodstock, New York area and has joined as the Music Coordinator. He is also working with Woodstock Festival co-founder Michael Lang in founding a music college in the Woodstock area. Green has also launched a weekly rock radio show on Radio Woodstock 100.1 WDST called "The Tool Shed with Paul Green" that airs on Saturday evenings from 7-9pm and streams online at RadioWoodstock.com.

Biography
Green grew up in the Port Richmond, Philadelphia. He was inspired to pick up a guitar at age 4 after looking at albums his guitarist mom owned. He went from being “Paul the nerdy kid to Paul the nerdy kid playing the guitar,  His father died when he was 5.

The Paul Green School of Rock Music

Paul Green began giving traditional individual music lessons in his home in 1996. He invited a group of his students to sit in, or "jam", with his own band with disappointing results. But by the third week, he found that the students who played in a group had advanced much more than the students who received only traditional solo instruction. He modified his teaching method to supplement traditional instruction with group practice, with the goal of playing a show. He compared it to the difference between "...shooting hoops and playing basketball". In 1999, the most advanced students played their first public concert at an art gallery.

He took out a loan for $7000 in 2002 and established a permanent location for the first Paul Green School of Rock Music in a dilapidated building at 1320 Race St, Philadelphia that has since been demolished. The location had a number of small rooms for individual instrumental instruction as well as larger performance spaces for full band practices. Spin magazine sent Smashing Pumpkins guitarist James Iha to profile Green and the school for the May 2002 issue. 
Green chose to name the school after himself to avoid both to confusion with the Herbie Hancock television program and to use his measure of local fame, but always referred the program as "Rock School" and answered the phone using the phrase. Additionally, Green established the domain SchoolofRock.com in 2001, first archived May 24, 2002.

In 2002, a crew from the Viacom television channel VH1 filmed for four days at the Philadelphia location for a proposed reality TV series. After the shoot, the producers stopped returning Green's phone calls. In January 2003 filmmakers Don Argott and Sheena M. Joyce attended a concert by the students, and decided to make a documentary about the school five minutes after the concert started. 
They met with Green the next day and began shooting video one day later, intending to follow an entire school year. Midway through the nine months of shooting what became Rock School, they learned that the Viacom movie studio Paramount would be releasing a fictional film to be called School of Rock featuring Jack Black as Dewey Finn, a would-be rock star teaching children to play rock music. Many critics claimed that Black's characterization was based on Green's man-child persona though screenwriter Mike White claimed that he had "...never heard of Paul Green before". Green considered a lawsuit, but decided against it, reasoning that the School benefited from the film saying "I considered suing, but what are you going to do? It's better, in a karmic sense, to just reap the rewards."

In 2002 Green had more than 100 students, and to maintain an acceptable student to teacher ratio, opened an additional location in Downingtown, Pennsylvania. Expansion continued in counties around Philadelphia, then into southern New Jersey and Delaware. Green's dentist, Dr. Joseph Roberts, became chairman of the board of the School and provided funding to expand to San Francisco; New York City; Austin, Texas; Cherry Hill, New Jersey; Salt Lake City; and Sandy, Utah.

Green was bought out in 2009 by investor Sterling Partners and the management team he had brought in, headed by former Clear Channel executive Matt Ross. Ross remained chief executive officer until 2010, managing the company's expansion and private equity acquisition. The name was changed to School of Rock in 2010, and former McDonald's executive Chris Catalano replaced Ross as CEO.

The program consists of year-round, weekly individual lessons as well as full band rehearsals for seasonal shows. Instructors are encouraged to stress the fundamentals of both popular music and music theory in their teaching. There are many teachers per school, all specializing in at least one instrument, often more. Instruction is available in the following areas: electric guitar, bass guitar, drums, keyboards, and vocals. Students are encouraged to play other instruments as well, with instruction from other sources. Students learn songs from popular bands/artists like Led Zeppelin, The Who, Pink Floyd, 80's glam metal, punk, and grunge. Those songs are eventually played at themed live shows held throughout the year.

There are occasional workshops featuring accomplished musicians, and the artists will include discussions about their past experiences, songwriting, live performance and fame in general. To be admitted, students generally must be between the ages of 7 and 18. No musical training or experience is necessary to attend the school.

Green's non-compete agreement with School of Rock expired in 2013, and he announced plans to open a Paul Green Rock Academy in Woodstock, NY to serve ages 8 to 18, as well as a Woodstock Music Lab in Ulster County with Woodstock Music Festival promoter Michael Lang. In February 2018, Green opened a Paul Green Rock Academy in Norwalk, CT.

The film: Rock School 
Rock School is a documentary about Paul Green and The Paul Green School of Rock Music. The documentary exhibits the school through the eyes of its founder, Paul Green. A New York Magazine film critic said, "Paul Green is letting his students in on a secret of life that goes beyond school, even stuff that looks easy is hard to do well." The film displays him showing off his wide variety of teaching tactics and also how the school affects the lives of the students that attend. Paul Green is seen several times jumping up and down, screaming at kids, and kicking students, all to teach them. As Ken Tucker, the National Public Radio rock critic, phrased it in his review, "I'd hand out DVDs of Rock School to everyone in the country with a teaching degree and dare them to match this level of commitment."

The Annual Paul Green School of Rock Festival
In June 2007, Paul unveiled his first School of Rock festival. The two-day event at the Jersey Shore in Asbury Park, New Jersey, attracted almost 10,000 people and served as the quintessential example of the School's initial hopes: music education for young musicians through live performances. The festival featured 400 kids from various branches of The Paul Green School of Rock Music from across the nation on stages side by side with headlining acts such as Ween, Bad Brains, the Benevento/Russo Duo and New Jersey's own, the Bouncing Souls. Special events included a lecture from Jello Biafra of Dead Kennedys fame and a shred contest sponsored by PRS Guitars.

The 2008 festival was held over the course of three days from June 27 to 29 in Philadelphia. The entire festival included themed shows from Schools as far west as California as well as the now-independent bands of former students. The All-Stars performed before the headlining acts on each day. The first day was held at the Electric Factory with performances by Andrew W.K. and the Butthole Surfers. The Festival Pier at Penn's Landing hosted the final two days with the Hold Steady and Devo on Saturday and Goldfinger, Less Than Jake and the Dropkick Murphys on Sunday. There was also a Shred Contest sponsored by Gibson Guitars, won by a Princeton SOR student named Russell Chell.

Paul Green's All-Stars
After a few years of running his school Paul decided to create the "All-Stars Program". All-Stars are a group of the best students from the entirety of the program, all across the country, handpicked from schools in the program through auditions. They go on tour to play such venues as BB Kings in Times Square, The Knitting Factory in LA and NYC, The Roxy and Crash Mansion in LA, Stubbs in Austin, Hard Rock Cafes, House of Blues, and many of the biggest festivals in the country such as Lollapalooza, Austin City Limits, along with many others.

They often tour and play with famous musicians from rock's past and present, such as the Butthole Surfers, Slash, Les Paul, Brendon Small, LeAnn Rimes, C. J. Tywoniak, Perry Farrell, Jon Anderson, Peter Frampton, Eddie Vedder, Alice Cooper, Adrian Belew, Napoleon Murphy Brock, Stewart Copeland, John Wetton, Jeff "Skunk" Baxter, Ike Willis, and Ann Wilson. Tryouts are held once a year. The audition requirements include one classic rock song with a backing band, and one solo song of their choice without a backing track. The All-Stars consist of five to seven nationally touring groups.

Quotes 

 "I hate the word talent. Talent seems to take away the achievements of human beings and giving it some sort of nebulous genetics. I know a lot of successful people and they all just tend to work a little harder than everyone else."
 "I like my drums hit hard and loud, all the time."

Musical Collaborations With Paul Green School of Rock
Paul Green and/or the Paul Green School of Rock have collaborated with the following artists:
 Aaron Freeman – Ween
 Ace Frehley – KISS and solo
 Adrian Belew – Zappa, Talking Heads, Bowie, King Crimson and solo (12+ shows and hired 2 of our kids)
 Alice Cooper – (3 shows)
 Ann Wilson – Lead singer of Heart (one show and sang on Rock School soundtrack)
 Bernie Worrell – Keyboardist for Parliament Funkadelic and Funk legend
 Billy Idol – (played on Rock School soundtrack)
 Brad Roberts – Lead Singer of Crash test Dummies
 Brendon Small – TV creator of Home Movies and Metalocalypse (6 shows)
 Carlos Alomar – Bowie guitarist and co writer
 Dave Mustaine – Megadeth (sang on Rock School soundtrack)
Donald Fagan – Steely Dan lead singer (performed with Paul's Rock Academy students in 2017)
 Dr. Know – Bad Brains guitarist (5 shows)
 Earl Slick – Guitarist for Bowie (15+ shows)
 Eddie Vedder – Pearl Jam
 Ellen Foley – Solo, sang on "Paradise by the Dashboard Light" and on several songs by The Clash
 George Lynch – Lead Guitarist of Dokken
 Gibby Haynes – Lead singer of Butthole Surfers (7 shows plus tour with the Butthole Surfers)
 Gregg Rolie – Lead Singer for Santana (played and sang on Rock School soundtrack)
 Ian Gillan – Deep Purple, Original Jesus in JCS (sang on Rock School soundtrack)
 Ike Willis – Zappa Band (20+shows)
 Jeff "Skunk" Baxter – Guitarist for Steely Dan and Doobie Brothers
 Jello Biafra – Lead Singer Dead Kennedys
 John Sebastian – "Hot town summer in the city"
 John Wetton – Lead singer/bassist of King Crimson/UK/ASIA (15+shows)
 Jon Anderson – Lead Singer of Yes (well over 50 shows)
 Kyle Gass – Tenacious D
 LeAnn Rimes
 Les Paul –  (amazing workshop!)
 Marky Ramone –  The Ramones (2 live shows and recorded the Rock School soundtrack)
 Mike Keneally – Zappa Band, Steve Vai Band (7+)
 Mike Starr – Bassist for Alice in Chains
 Napoleon Murphy Brock – Zappa Band (well over 40 if you count National Guest Professor shows)
 Nash Kato – Lead singer/Guitarist of Urge Overkill
 Perry Farrell – Jane's Addiction (7+)
 Peter DiStefano – Guitarist of Porno for Pyros, shows at Austin City Limits annually
 Peter Frampton
 Ronnie Spector – Soul legend
 Scott Ian – guitarist of Anthrax
 Slash – Guns and Roses, Velvet Revolver
 Steven Adler – Guns and Roses
 Stewart Copeland – The Police (1 show and played on Rock School soundtrack)
 Vernon Reid – Living Color, Solo, Many Studio Credits (5x)

References

External links
 Official website for School of Rock of Greater Washington DC Maryland Virginia
Official website of School of Rock
School of Rock Festival
Official website for Paul Green Rock Academy

1972 births
21st-century American businesspeople
21st-century American guitarists
21st-century American male musicians
Living people
American film score composers
American male guitarists
American music arrangers
American music industry executives
American rock musicians
Guitarists from Philadelphia
Songwriters from Pennsylvania
American male film score composers
American male songwriters